The United Nations Educational, Scientific and Cultural Organization (UNESCO) World Heritage Sites are places of importance to cultural or natural heritage as described in the UNESCO World Heritage Convention, established in 1972. Malta ratified the convention on 14 November 1978, making its sites eligible for inclusion on the list.

Sites in Malta were first inscribed on the list at the 4th Session of the World Heritage Committee, held in Paris, France, in 1980. At that session, all three current sites were added to the list: the Ħal Saflieni Hypogeum, City of Valletta, and Ġgantija Temples. In 1992, the temples of Ħaġar Qim, Mnajdra, Ta' Ħaġrat, Skorba, and Tarxien were added to the site of Ġgantija Temples, to form the Megalithic Temples of Malta site. Further minor modification of boundaries of this site took place in 2015. All three sites are listed as cultural sites, as determined by the organization's selection criteria.

As of 2019, Malta also has seven sites on the tentative list, all of which were listed in 1998.



World Heritage Sites 
UNESCO lists sites under ten criteria; each entry must meet at least one of the criteria. Criteria i through vi are cultural, and vii through x are natural.

Tentative list 
In addition to the sites inscribed on the World Heritage list, member states can maintain a list of tentative sites that they may consider for nomination. Nominations for the World Heritage list are only accepted if the site has previously been listed on the tentative list. As of 2018, Malta had seven such sites on its tentative list, all of which were added in 1998.

References 

 
Malta
World Heritage Sites